This is a list of members of the Victorian Legislative Council from the elections of 20 March – 14 July 1880 to the elections of 30 November 1882.

There were six Electoral Provinces and five members elected to each Province.

Note the "Term in Office" refers to that members term(s) in the Council, not necessarily for that Province.

William Mitchell was President of the Council, Caleb Jenner was Chairman of Committees.

 J. Cumming left Parliament in August 1880, replaced by Philip Russell who was sworn-in in September 1880.
 Fraser resigned November 1881, replaced by William Stanbridge who was sworn-in in December 1881.
 Henty died 12 January 1882, replaced by Francis Ormond who was sworn-in the same month.
 Highett left Parliament in September 1880 (dying the following month), replaced by William McCulloch in September 1880.
 Reid resigned July 1881, replaced by William Pearson, Sr. who was sworn-in in August 1881.
 S. Wilson resigned May 1881, replaced by Thomas Forrest Cumming the same month.
 W. Wilson vacated his seat in July 1880, replaced by John George Dougharty who was sworn-in in August 1880.

References

 Re-member (a database of all Victorian MPs since 1851). Parliament of Victoria.

Members of the Parliament of Victoria by term
19th-century Australian politicians